is the first single by Morning Musume subgroup Minimoni. It was released on January 17, 2001 and sold 763,380 copies. It peaked at number one in Japan on the weekly Oricon chart, charting for seventeen weeks.

Track listing

Members at time of single

References

External links 
 Minimoni Jankenpyon!/Haru Natsu Aki Fuyu Daisukki! entry on the Hello! Project official website

Zetima Records singles
Minimoni songs
2001 debut singles
Oricon Weekly number-one singles
Songs written by Tsunku
Song recordings produced by Tsunku
Japanese-language songs